Monza (locally) is a city and comune on the River Lambro, a tributary of the Po in the Lombardy region of Italy, about  north-northeast of Milan. It is the capital of the Province of Monza and Brianza. Monza is best known for its Grand Prix motor racing circuit, the Autodromo Nazionale di Monza, which hosts the Formula One Italian Grand Prix with a massive Italian support tifosi for the Ferrari team.

On 11 June 2004, Monza was designated the capital of the new province of Monza and Brianza. The new administrative arrangement came fully into effect in summer 2009; previously, Monza was a comune within the province of Milan. Monza is the third-largest city of Lombardy and is the most important economic, industrial and administrative centre of the Brianza area, supporting a textile industry and a publishing trade. Monza also hosts a Department of the University of Milan Bicocca, a Court of Justice and several offices of regional administration. Monza Park is one of the largest urban parks in Europe.

Geography and topography 
Monza shares its position with Milan in the same metro area, and is a big part of its new province.

Monza is crossed from north to south by the River Lambro. The river enters Monza from the north, between Via Aliprandi and Via Zanzi streets. This is an artificial fork of the river, created for defensive purposes in the early decades of the 14th century. The fork is known as Lambretto and it rejoins the main course of the Lambro as it exits to the south, leaving Monza through the now-demolished ancient circle of medieval walls. Another artificial stream is the Canale Villoresi, which was constructed in the late 19th century.

Precipitation is abundant, with most occurring in the autumn and the least in winter and summer; despite this, the city and surrounding area usually does not suffer drought in any season.

History

Prehistory and ancient era 

Funerary urns found in the late 19th century show that humans were in the area dating at the least to the Bronze Age, when people would have lived in pile dwelling settlements raised above the rivers and marshes.

During the Roman Empire, Monza was known as Modicia. During the 3rd century BCE, the Romans subdued the Insubres, a Gaul tribe that had crossed the Alps and settled around Mediolanum (now Milan). A Gallo-Celtic tribe, perhaps the Insubres themselves, founded a village on the Lambro. The ruins of a Roman bridge named Ponte d'Arena can be seen near today's Ponte dei Leoni (Lions Bridge).

Middle Ages 
Theodelinda, daughter of Garibald I of Bavaria and wife of the Lombard king Authari (and later of king Agilulf), chose Monza as her summer residence. Here in 595 she founded an oraculum dedicated to St. John the Baptist. According to the legend, Theodelinda, asleep while her husband was hunting, saw a dove in a dream that told her: modo (Latin for "here") indicating that she should build the oraculum in that place, and the queen answered etiam, meaning "yes". According to this legend, the medieval name of Monza, "Modoetia", is derived from these two words. She also had a palace (the future Royal palace) built here.

Berengar I of Italy (850–924) located his headquarters in Monza. A fortified castrum was constructed to resist the incursions of the Hungarians. Under Berengar's reign, Monza enjoyed a certain degree of independence: it had its own system of weights and measures, and could also seize property and mark the deeds with their signatures. Berengar was very generous evident by the donation of numerous works to the Monza Cathedral, including the famous cross, and by giving large benefits to its 32 canons and other churches.

In 980 Monza hosted Emperor Otto II inside the walled city. The Glossary of Monza, one of the earliest examples of the evolution of the Italian language, probably dates to the early 10th century. In 1000 Emperor Otto III became the protector of Monza and its possessions: Bulciago, Cremella, Lurago, Locate and Garlate.

In 1018, Aribert (970–1045), Lord of Monza, was consecrated bishop of Milan, resulting in the city losing its independence from its rival. These years saw a power struggle between the emperor Conrad II, and Aribert. When the emperor died, he left important donations to the church of Monza.

In the 12th century, it is estimated that the city of Monza had about 7,000 inhabitants. Agriculture was the main occupation, although crafts had begun to grow in importance. In 1128 Conrad III of Hohenstaufen was crowned King of Italy in the Church of San Michele at Monza.

In 1136 emperor Lothair III guaranteed the independence of the clergy of Monza from Milan. Monza subsequently regained its autonomy, which was not limited to the feudal government of lands and goods; the archpriest of Monza was confirmed the authority of the clergy of his church (year 1150). This autonomy was never absolute, as the church of Monza was not able to completely cut its ties with the bishop of Milan.

Frederick I Barbarossa visited Monza twice (1158 and 1163). During this period the city again regained its independence from Milan, a city hostile to the emperor. Frederick declared that Monza was his property and also gave the Curraria (the right to levy customs on the streets), a right usually granted only to royal seats.

During the period of the struggle against Milan and other cities of the Lombard League, Monza was primarily an administrative centre for Barbarossa. Monzan independence lasted until 1185 when Barbarossa ended the conflict with the Lombard League with the peace of Constance. He allowed the city of Milan to self-rule its subjects again while taking possession of the treasury of the cathedral.

In 1185 Henry VI, son of Barbarossa, was crowned king at Monza, on the occasion of his marriage to Queen Constanza of Sicily, heir to the Norman kingdom.

As early as the 12th century, Monza was a fortified place, although the status of free city had changed its economical role. Agricultural activities were now paired by the production of clothes, while wool processing developed on large farms outside the walls.

Monza was increasingly linked to events of Milan and shared its history and enemies: in 1255 the city was sacked by the Ghibellines, and in 1259 and Ezzelino III da Romano tried to seize the castle of Monza but was repelled; the village was set on fire.

After the decisive 1277 victory of the Visconti at the Battle of Desio, Monza was occupied by Archbishop Ottone Visconti and the Marquis of Montferrat, William VII (1278). The following year, the town was declared a possession of the people of Milan.

14th–17th centuries 

In 1312, Monza adhered to the Ghibelline faction.

Enrico Aliprandi, a member of a family of Monza, joined the Torriani faction, with many enlisted soldiers under his command. He was acclaimed Lord of Monza by the people in 1322. The same year, Luchino Visconti and Francesco Garbagnate demolished the walls of Monza to prevent it from defending itself against attacks from the Milanese.

In 1325 Galeazzo I Visconti, who conquered the city after a long siege, began the construction of new defences. Among the projects was the bifurcation of the River Lambro (the "Lambretto" branch) and the construction of a castle, the third in Monza. The Castle of Monza was later expanded to such a degree that it was necessary to demolish the St. Mary of Ingino church as space was needed for new buildings. Two other towers were also built along the River Lambro. In 1327 Galeazzo himself was imprisoned in the Forni, by order of emperor Louis IV. He was released the next year.

In April 1329, the condottiero Pinalla Aliprandi regained Monza from the imperial troops. Azzone Visconti allowed the reconstruction of the walls, beginning in 1333 and lasting until 1381. Martino Aliprandi was podestà of Monza from 1334 to 1336, overseeing the construction of the walls and the fortification of the fortress.

In 1354 Pope Innocent VI proclaimed the undisputed right to impose, in the Cathedral of Monza, the Crown of Italy, the Iron Crown. In 1380 Gian Galeazzo Visconti donated the castle to his wife Catherine, who died there after having been jailed by her son Giovanni Maria (1404). In 1407 Estorre Visconti was proclaimed Lord of Monza and began minting Monza's own coinage.

Antonio de Leyva, the Spanish governor of Milan and commander of the imperial troops, sacked the city in 1527. In the same year, a mine exploded causing the partial destruction of the Castle of Monza. De Leyva became Lord of Monza in 1529, devoting himself to the government regulation of ecclesiastical affairs, controlling their taxes and duties and shutting the doors of those who did not pay. His relative Marianna de Leyva was the inspiration to Alessandro Manzoni for his Nun of Monza.

The plague, which struck Monza in 1576 and 1630, caused a profound demographic and economic crisis. In 1648, Monza and its territory became the property of the Milanese Durini family.

The Duchy of Milan and Monza remained subject to the Spanish crown until the early 18th century.

18th century 

At the end of the War of the Spanish Succession (1713), the Duchy of Milan was assigned to the House of Habsburg of Austria. This historical period is a season of rebirth of the city, with a considerable development of agriculture and crafts.

Empress Maria Theresa built the Royal Villa of Monza for her son Ferdinand, Governor of Milan (1777–1780). The choice of Monza was due not only to the beauty of the landscape, but also its strategic position and the fact that it was connected to Vienna as well as its proximity to Milan. The construction was completed in three years with design by architect Giuseppe Piermarini from Foligno.

At the conclusion of the Italian campaign of Napoleon Bonaparte (1796), the Duchy of Milan was acquired first by the French Republic and then entered the Cisalpine Republic (which, in 1802, became the Italian Republic).

19th century 

Considered by the French as a symbol of aristocratic power, the Royal Villa was destined for demolition. However, the protests of citizens stopped the process, although the abandonment caused the complex to decay.

Two-thirds of the gold and silver treasures of the Monza Cathedral were delivered to the mint of Milan, which turned them into coins used for military expenses. Bonaparte also took possession of the treasures of the Basilica and the Chapter Library books, and transferred them to the National Library in Paris. The Iron Crown was left provisionally in Monza.

In 1805, the Italian Republic became the Kingdom of Italy with its capital in Milan. On 26 May 1805, the Iron Crown was in Milan for the coronation of Napoleon Bonaparte, who put it on his head, uttering the famous phrase "God gave it to me, woe to anyone who touches it." Napoleon also established the Order of the Iron Crown. Monza received the title of Imperial City. The Viceroy of Italy, Eugène de Beauharnais, was appointed in August 1805 and he settled in the Villa of Monza. In 1807 the castle was demolished.

In the fall of the First Empire (1815), Austria annexed the Italian territories to the Kingdom of Lombardy-Venetia, Monza being included in the province of Milan. The Monzesi asked for the restoration of all the treasures taken by the French. In 1816 the city returned the possession of the books of the Treasury and Chapter Library. The Crown of Agilulf, however, had been melted in Paris.

The next emperor Ferdinand I of Austria had himself crowned King of Lombardy and Venetia in Milan with the Iron Crown (6 September 1838), with the opportunity to extend various benefits to the city. New roads are opened, including the King Ferdinand road (now Via Vittorio Emanuele), while in 1842 the Bridge of Lions was erected near the old Roman bridge. In 1841 the first railway connecting Milan and Monza was inaugurated.

Monza took part in the Five Days of Milan (22–23 March 1848) Monza, expelling the Austrian garrison. The Austrians returned in 1849.

In 1859, at the end of the Second Italian War of Independence, Lombardy became part of the Kingdom of Sardinia. But the treasure and the Iron Crown had been transferred to Vienna by the Austrians and was returned to Monza only after the conclusion of the Third War of Italian Independence (December 1866).

On 31 December 1895 Monza had about 37,500 permanent inhabitants. The economy was based on the production of wheat, corn, fodder, potatoes, oats, rye and vegetables in general. Another source of wealth was the breeding of silkworms.

In 1900 Monza was the scene of the assassination of King Umberto I by anarchist Gaetano Bresci. To commemorate the spot of the crime, his successor Victor Emmanuel III ordered the construction of an Expiatory Chapel on Via Matteo da Campione.

20th century 

At the beginning of the century, Monza counted 41,200 inhabitants; in 1911 it was among the eight most industrialised centres of Italy. The main activities were related to the processing of cotton, mechanics, hat factories and industries.

Between the two world wars, the city's industrial structure did not undergo substantial change while recording significant increases in production volumes. The Autodromo (1922) and a golf course (1925) were built in the park.

The Second World War, between 1940 and 1945, caused several bombings of Monza, with civilian casualties; after the September 1943 Italian Armistice, the area was occupied by the Germans.

In the second half of the century, the city experienced a significant increase in population and subsequent building development. With the development of various activities occurring problems related to traffic and links to nearby towns, especially with Milan.

21st century 
At the beginning of the century, Monza had about 120,000 inhabitants. The city became the capital of the Province of Monza and Brianza on 11 June 2004. In 2009–2013 a tunnel was built to supplement the Viale Lombardia (SS36 national road), one of the busiest streets in Europe.

Government

Main sights 
In the course of its history, Monza withstood thirty-two sieges, but the Porta d'Agrate is all that remains of its original walls and fortifications. Nearby is the nunnery in which the Nun of Monza was enclosed in Manzoni's I Promessi Sposi.

Monza is known for its Romanesque-Gothic style Cathedral of Saint John (Duomo). The black-and-white marble arcaded façade was erected in the mid-14th century by Matteo da Campione. The campanile was erected in 1606 to designs by Pellegrino Tibaldi.

The cathedral encloses the Chapel of Theodelinda, a centrally-planned Greek-cross oraculum ("chapel of prayer") dated to circa 595. The foundations remain under the crossing of nave and transept, but at the close of the 13th century, the chapel was enlarged by enclosing the former atrium within the building. The frescoed chapel houses the Iron Crown of Lombardy, said to include one of the nails used at the Crucifixion of Jesus. The treasury also contains the crown, fan and gold comb of Theodelinda, and, as well as Gothic crosses and reliquaries, a golden hen and seven chickens, representing Lombardy and her seven provinces. Though the interior has suffered changes, there is a fine relief by Matteo da Campione representing a royal Lombard coronation, and some 15th-century frescoes with scenes from the life of Theodelinda.

The historical centre also includes the following buildings:
Santa Maria in Strada: a medieval church with a rich terra-cotta façade (1393)
Broletto or Arengario: the 14th-century palace of the civic commune, raised on an arcade of pointed arches, with a tall square machiolated tower terminating in a sharp central cone.
San Pietro Martire
Santa Maria delle Grazie: 15th-century church
Oratory of St. Gregory (17th century)
Santa Maria al Carrobiolo: 16th-century church
Expiatory Chapel of Monza (Cappella Espiatoria): Memorial chapel built in 1900 in memory of the assassinated King Umberto I of Italy 
Royal Villa: Villa built during the period of Austrian rule in the Duchy of Milan.
Monza Park and the gardens of the Royal Palace are among the largest in Europe to be enclosed by walls. The park has an area of approximately 685 hectares (1693 acres) and is located in the northern part of the city, between the towns of Lesmo, Villasanta, Vedano al Lambro and Biassono.

Other villas includes the Mirabello, Mirabellino, Durini, Crivelli Mesmer, Prata, Villa Archinto Pennati, Calloni and Villa Carminati-Ferrario.

Culture and education

Cuisine
The cuisine of Monza is typical of Insubria and Brianza. It is linked to culinary traditions and the bond with the nearby areas, especially with the Milanese cuisine. Typical dishes are cassoeula, the buseca, risotto with luganega.

University 
There are two departments of the University of Milan Bicocca located in Monza: the faculty of Medicine and Surgery and the Faculty of Sociology.

Museums 
The Duomo's (Cathedral) Museum collection is home to early medieval treasures from the time of Queen Theodelinda, including the gilt silver "Hen with Chicks", the Cross of Agilulf, and the Iron Crown; there are also pieces from the late medieval, modern and contemporary ages.

Theatres and cinemas 
Theatre in the city include the Teatro Manzoni, the Teatro Villoresi, the Teatro Binario 7. Cinemas include the Sala San Carlo, the AreaOdeon, the Cinema Capitol, the Cinema Metropol and the Cinema Teodolinda.

Events 
 Formula One Italian Grand Prix, at the beginning of September
 Feast of Saint Gerardo dei Tintori, on 6 June

Sport 

Monza is internationally known for the Autodromo Nazionale di Monza motor racing circuit, home to the Italian Grand Prix usually held in September, and previously to the Alfa Romeo team. Meanwhile, the Golf Club Milano is a golf course that has hosted nine editions of the Italian Open. Both are located inside the Monza Park, which comprises 688 ha.

The Italian Grand Prix has been hosted at the Monza circuit in every single year of Formula One history bar one (1980), and although no Italian has won the race since Ludovico Scarfiotti in 1966, the local support is for the Ferrari team, which has taken many historical wins on the circuit, especially with Michael Schumacher winning five times between 1996 and 2006. The event also saw Jody Scheckter secure the 1979 title in that event among other historical wins such as the Ferrari 1-2 finish against the odds in 1988. The Ferrari fans at Monza are known both in Italian and internationally as tifosi. Aside from Ferrari, another Italian milestone at the venue was German 21-year old Sebastian Vettel taking his and Italian team Scuderia Toro Rosso's first win in torrential rain in 2008.

The event has been marred by tragedy several times, involving driver fatalities such as Wolfgang von Trips, Jochen Rindt and Ronnie Peterson, but also a fatal accident involving a trackside marshal in 2000, and multiple spectators being killed in von Trips' fatal accident in 1961. Monza is an extremely fast circuit that has been modified with three chicanes to curb speeds, but is still the fastest circuit on the Formula One calendar and is considered too fast to be considered to host MotoGP and no longer holds Superbike World Championship events either. When it hosted the Italian motorcycle Grand Prix it saw a double fatal accident for Jarno Saarinen and Renzo Pasolini in 1973 after a pile-up through the dauntingly fast Curva Grande, that has since had significant runoff added to it. Italy's last Formula One champion Alberto Ascari also died at the Monza circuit in 1955, but it was during a test of a road car rather than during a race.

The Serie A1 volleyball club Vero Volley Monza plays currently at the Monza Arena. In 2006 Monza hosted the World Cyber Games tournament, and in July 2005 and July 2008, Monza hosted the "International Gran Galà Marching Show Bands" at Stadio Brianteo (with the USA band Blue Devils, 11 times WMSB Champion of the World).

Transport

Rail 
Monza railway station is the most important railway junction in the Brianza area. Trains travel between Monza and Milan via the Suburban Railway (Line S9) and via local trains that connect Monza to Lecco, Como/Chiasso (CH) and Bergamo/Brescia. Also some EuroCity trains stop in Monza. In early 2008, work began on the expansion of Subway Line MM1 from Milano/Sesto San Giovanni to Monza Bettola. Monza railway station is located in Enrico Arosio Road.

Roads 
Monza can be reached through the following motorways: A4-E64 (Turin-Milan-Venice), A52 (North Ring of Milan), A51 (East Ring of Milan). State road (SS36 – Nuova Valassina) connects the city to Lecco and Sondrio.

The centre is off-limits to cars and other motorised vehicles.

People 
 Theodoric the Great (454–526), King of Ostrogoths
 Agilulf (c. 550–616), King of Lombardy
 Theodelinda (c. 570–628), Queen of Lombardy
 Gundeberga (c. 591–652), Queen of Lombardy and Italy
 Adaloald (602–626), King of Lombardy and Italy
 Rothari (606–652), King of Lombard and Italy
 Berengar I of Italy (c. 845–924), King of Italy
 Saint Gerardo dei Tintori (c. 1134 or 1140–1207), saint
 Bonincontro Morigia (14th century), historical writer
 Giuseppe Arcimboldo (1527–1593), painter
 Carlo Amati (1776–1852), architect
 Paolo Mantegazza (1831–1910), neurologist, physiologist and anthropologist
 Mosè Bianchi (1840–1904), painter
 Luigi Talamoni (1848–1926), priest and blessed
 Emilio Borsa (1857–1931), painter
 Pompeo Mariani (1857-1927), painter
 Ernesto Ambrosini (1894–1951), athlete
 Costantino Nivola (1911–1988), painter and sculptor
 Fiorenzo Magni (1920), cyclist
 Valentino Giambelli (1928), footballer and builder
 Vittorio Brambilla (1937–2001), F1 racer
 Gian Paolo Dulbecco (1941), painter
 Adriano Galliani (1944), football manager
 Daniele Massaro (1961), footballer
 Filippo Galli (1963), footballer
 Fabrizio Barbazza (1963), F1 racer
 Gianni Bugno (1964), cyclist
 Marco Monti (1964), footballer and youth coach
 Francesco Antonioli (1969), footballer
 Pierluigi Casiraghi (1969), footballer
 Marco Castoldi (1972), singer
 Massimo Brambilla (1973), footballer
 Ewn Garabandal (1978), novelist
 Stefano Mauri (1980), footballer
 Matteo Pessina (1997), footballer
 Federico Malvestiti (2000), racing driver

Twin cities 
  Indianapolis, Indiana, United States
 Prague, Czech Republic

References

Sources
 AA.VV. Biographic Dictionary of Italians. Rome, 1960 (Aliprandi Pinalla).
 AA.VV. Church of St. Mark in Milan. Milan, 1998. Pag. 56–57 (Aliprandi Martino).
 Il Duomo di Monza, 1300–2000, VII Centenary of foundation. Silvana Ed., 1999.

External links

 Official website
 Monza Mobilita (Transportation)
 Province of Monza and Brianza
 Official website of the University of Milano-Bicocca

 
Populated places on Brianza